Reshian is a village in Hattian Bala District of Azad Kashmir, Pakistan.

Reshian is the gateway to Leepa Valley. The village accessible from Muzaffarabad by Muzaffarabad-Chakothi road  branches off at Naile. Buses run daily between Muzaffarabad and Reshian.

References

Populated places in Jhelum Valley District
Villages in Jhelum Valley District